The following is a list of former members of the Georgia State Senate (1789–present) and the prior Executive Council (1777-1789).

List

Georgia (U.S. state) state senators